"What Good Is A Glass Dagger?" is a fantasy short story written by Larry Niven and published for the first time in 1972. It occurs in the same fictional universe as the book The Magic Goes Away, by Niven, being the second story in this universe, the sequel to the short story "Not Long Before the End". Asimov comments that in this story Niven "seeks to provide a scientific explanation for magic". The concept of mana appears in it, and from it has spread to the RPGs. However, it is not original to the book, as Niven said he learned about it by reading the book  The Trumpet Shall Sound  (1968). Niven also invokes the principle of mass conservation at some point in the narrative.

Plot

References

1972 short stories

pt:Para que Serve uma Adaga de Vidro?